Bagoas (Old Persian: Bagāvahyā,  Bagōas) was the name of two eunuchs in the court of the Persian Empire in the 4th century BC. Bagoas the Younger was a courtier of Darius and later of Alexander the Great.

Bagoas' kiss
According to Plutarch, Bagoas won a dancing contest after the Macedonian crossing of the Gedrosian Desert. The Macedonian troops, with whom Bagoas was very popular, demanded that king Alexander should kiss Bagoas, and he did so.

Fictionalized versions
 Bagoas is the narrator and title character of The Persian Boy, the historical novel by Mary Renault, which portrays him sympathetically. He reappears in a smaller but still significant role in the sequel Funeral Games.
The Serpent's Oath (2021) by A.R. Valeson portrays a historical fiction romance between King Henry VIII's Master Secretary, Thomas Cromwell and the eunuch, Arthamaeus, inspired by the courtier Bagoas.
 He makes an even briefer appearance in Les Conquêtes d'Alexandre by Roger Peyrefitte. Peyrefitte, unlike Mary Renault, has Bagoas riding to battle by the side of Darius.
He is also a major character in Jo Graham's novel Stealing Fire, part of her Numinous World series. Graham's Bagoas is basically the same as Mary Renault's, except that he is more willing to find a new lover after the death of Alexander the Great.
 He is played by Francisco Bosch in the Oliver Stone film Alexander (2004), which is based in part on  Renault's writings.

Notes

Sources

External links
"Bagoas Pleads on Behalf of Nabarzanes," illuminated parchment by the Master of the Jardin de vertueuse consolation, in the collection of the J. Paul Getty Museum

Ancient LGBT people
Male lovers of royalty
People from the Achaemenid Empire
Iranian eunuchs
Trierarchs of Nearchus' fleet
Lovers of Alexander the Great
Courtiers of Alexander the Great
4th-century BC people
Ancient slaves